Foreign Trade Review(FTR), a peer-reviewed quarterly journal of IIFT (Co-published with Sage), has more than five and half decades of existence in the academic research fraternity. Since its inception in 1966, the Journal publishes articles having high academic rigour on theoretical or empirical issues on cross-border issues. Foreign Trade Review follows a double-blind peer review policy. Rather than replication exercises, submissions are sought for new ways of estimating existing theoretical models and development of new theoretical models along with their empirical estimation. Over the period, the journal has developed a wider reach.Articles published in FTR covers disciplines such as international trade, WTO issues, international finance, regional trade blocs, global financial crisis, trade facilitation, role of IT in international business, sectoral analysis, etc. The target audience of FTR includes academicians, university professors, researchers, policy makers, policy analysts, trade and industry professionals, various university libraries, management institutes, multilateral bodies like WTO, UNCTAD, World Bank etc. 
This journal is a member of the Committee on Publication Ethics (COPE).

Editorial Board
Members of the Board

Abstracting and indexing 
Foreign Trade Review is abstracted and indexed in:

Chartered Association of Business Schools (ABS)
Clarivate Analytics: Emerging Sources Citation Index (ESCI)
SCOPUS
UGC-CARE (GROUP I)
DeepDyve
Dutch-KB
EconLit
Indian Citation Index (ICI)
J-Gate
Ohio
Portico
ProQuest: International Bibliography of the Social Sciences (IBSS)
Research Papers in Economics (RePEc)

Journal Webpage
 Foreign Trade Review

Manuscript Submission Link
 SAGE Track
Submission guideline

References
 https://web.archive.org/web/20160424013224/http://edu.iift.ac.in:81/iift/publications.php 
 http://publicationethics.org/members/foreign-trade-review

SAGE Publishing academic journals
Quarterly journals
Development studies journals
Publications established in 2013
International trade